Cowman is an occupational surname of Norman origin. from cowman.  A rare surname throughout the world today, Cowman is most common in Ireland.  Notable persons with that surname include:

Charles Cowman (1868–1924), American missionary to Japan
Dick Cowman (b. 1949), rugby player
Joseph Cowman (fl. 1705–1748), one of the founders of the Patuxent Iron Works
Lettie Cowman (1870–1960), American author
Roz Cowman (born 1942), is an Irish poet and critic
Stan Cowman (1923–2003), New Zealand cricket umpire

See also
Cowman (disambiguation)

References

Occupational surnames
English-language surnames
Surnames of English origin
English-language occupational surnames